Bomun Station is a railway station on Seoul Subway Line 6 and Ui LRT located on Bomun-dong 1-ga, Seongbuk-gu, Seoul.

Station layout

References 

Railway stations opened in 2000
Metro stations in Seongbuk District
Seoul Metropolitan Subway stations